Daniel Vasconcellos Paiola (born May 4, 1989) is a Brazilian badminton player. He became the first Brazilian badminton player to win an individual medal in the Pan American Games when he won a bronze in the men's singles event at the 2011 Games, losing in the semi-finals to Guatemalan Kevin Cordón. He has medaled ten at the Pan American Badminton Championships, and is a one-time national champion.

Early life
Paiola was born in Campinas, and his father died when he was one year old. He started out playing tennis, but took up badminton at age 13 after a shoulder injury took him out for year. While still a teenager, his mother sent him to train in Portugal with Marco Vasconcelos, a fifteen-time Portuguese national champion, and his training also took him to Spain, Denmark and Malaysia. His first international tournament was the 2007 Pan Am Junior Badminton Championships, where he competed in the under-19 boys' singles and mixed doubles events.

Professional career
Paiola made his professional international debut at the 2008 South Africa International in Cape Town, where he won a gold medal in the men's singles category.

In August 2011, Paiola competed at the 2011 BWF World Championships in London. He lost his first match to Kazushi Yamada of Japan (13-21, 9-21). He also competed in men's doubles with compatriot Hugo Arthuso. They lost in the first round to Chris Adcock and Andrew Ellis (10-21, 11-21).

He also competed at the 2014 BWF World Championships in Kuala Lumpur. In the men's singles tournament, he lost his first match against Austrian David Obernosterer (21-17, 11-21, 17-21). He also participated in mixed doubles, where he and Paula Pereira lost in the first round to the Austrian pairing of Roman Zirnwald and Elisabeth Baldauf (15-21, 17-21). The following August at the 2015 event, though, he avenged his loss to Obernosterer by beating him by the scores of 21-14, 11-21, 24-22. He subsequently lost his second-round match with Lin Dan (widely considered one of the greatest badminton players ever) with scores of 14-21, 14-21.

Achievements

Pan American Games
Men's singles

Men's doubles

Pan Am Championships
Men's singles

Men's doubles

Mixed doubles

South American Games
Men's singles

Men's doubles

BWF International Challenge/Series
Men's singles

Men's doubles

Mixed doubles

 BWF International Challenge tournament
 BWF International Series tournament
 BWF Future Series tournament

References

External links
 
 2011 Pan Am Games bio

Living people
1989 births
Sportspeople from Campinas
Brazilian male badminton players
Badminton players at the 2011 Pan American Games
Badminton players at the 2015 Pan American Games
Pan American Games silver medalists for Brazil
Pan American Games bronze medalists for Brazil
Pan American Games medalists in badminton
South American Games gold medalists for Brazil
South American Games silver medalists for Brazil
South American Games medalists in badminton
Competitors at the 2010 South American Games
Medalists at the 2011 Pan American Games
Medalists at the 2015 Pan American Games
21st-century Brazilian people
20th-century Brazilian people